Love Live! is a Japanese multimedia project created by Hajime Yatate and Sakurako Kimino. Each of the individual titles within the franchise revolve around teenage girls who become "school idols". The first series of the franchise, titled Love Live! School Idol Project, was created in 2010 which consists of 9-members group called μ's (read as Muse). The second group, Aqours (read as Aqua), was created in 2015. A spin-off group, which consists of 12 girls who are rivals to each other, Nijigasaki High School Idol Club, was created in 2018 as part of the franchise's game series Love Live! School Idol Festival All Stars. The fourth group, Liella!, was created in 2020 and consists of 5 first year high school girls, soon expanding to 9 members during the anime's second season.

The franchise's music is produced by Bandai Namco Arts under the label, Lantis. Aki Hata serves as the main lyricist for μ's and Aqours.

Some titles containing English words which are officially stylized in unusual title case are rendered below in normal title case.

Overview

Love Live! School Idol Project

The 9-member school idol group, named μ's, have 47 singles. They were normally active from their first single from August 2010, until the "final" single in March 2016. However, in commemoration of the franchise's ninth anniversary, their latest single "A Song for You! You? You!!" was released in March 2020 with a music video. Seven of μ's' singles include an anime music video.

Aside from individual and duet singles, the nine idols of μ's are divided into three mini units with their own singles themselves: Printemps (Honoka, Kotori, and Hanayo), BiBi (Eli, Maki, and Nico), and Lily White (stylized in all lowercase) (Umi, Rin, and Nozomi).

Singles

Original song CDs

Albums

Live concerts and video albums

Radio CDs

Love Live! Sunshine!!

The nine idols of Aqours are grouped into three subunits: CYaRon! (You, Ruby and Chika), Azalea (stylized in all-caps; Dia, Kanan and Hanamaru), and Guilty Kiss (Yoshiko, Riko and Mari). Five of Aqours' singles include an anime music video.

The 2-member rival group, Saint Snow, have their own songs. Some are included in Aqours' singles and albums, and others have their own. Some songs may include Aqours and Saint Snow joint performances, in which they are collectively called Saint Aqours Snow.

Singles
{| class="wikitable" style="text-align:center;"
! scope="col" rowspan="1" | Title
! scope="col" rowspan="1" width="25%" | Artist(s)
! scope="col" colspan="1" width="10%" | Release date
! scope="col" rowspan="1" width="8%" | Peak Oriconchart positions
! scope="col" rowspan="1" width="7%"| Certifications(sales thresholds)
! scope="col" rowspan="1" width="25%" | Notes
|-
| 
| rowspan="2"|Aqours
| October 7, 2015
| 3
| JP: Gold
| Aqours' first single
|-
|
| April 27, 2016
| 3
| JP: Gold
| Aqours' second single
|-
| 
| CYaRon!
| May 11, 2016
| 6
| rowspan="17" |
| CYaRon!'s first single
|-
| 
| Azalea
| May 25, 2016
| 7
| Azalea's first single
|-
| "Strawberry Trapper"
| Guilty Kiss
| June 8, 2016
| 5
| Guilty Kiss' first single
|-
| 
| Aqours
| July 20, 2016
| 4
| Opening theme of the anime's first season
|-
|  / 
| Chika Takami (Anju Inami), You Watanabe (Shuka Saitou), and Riko Sakurauchi (Rikako Aida)
| August 3, 2016
| 5
| First insert song's single of the anime's first season
|-
| 
| Aqours
| August 24, 2016
| 3
| Ending theme of the anime's first season
|-
|  / 
| Chika Takami (Anju Inami), Riko Sakurauchi (Rikako Aida), You Watanabe (Shuka Saito), Yoshiko Tsushima (Aika Kobayashi), Hanamaru Kunikida (Kanako Takatsuki), and Ruby Kurosawa (Ai Furihata) / Aqours
| September 14, 2016
| 2
| rowspan="2"|Other two insert song's singles of the anime's first season
|-
|  / "Mirai Ticket"
| Chika Takami (Anju Inami), Kanan Matsuura (Nanaka Suwa), Dia Kurosawa (Arisa Komiya), You Watanabe (Shuka Saito), Yoshiko Tsushima (Aika Kobayashi), Hanamaru Kunikida (Kanako Takatsuki), Mari Ohara (Aina Suzuki), and Ruby Kurosawa (Ai Furihata) / Aqours
| November 9, 2016
| 3
|-
| 
| Aqours
| November 23, 2016
| 3
| Special single for Love Live! School Idol Festival
|-
| 
| CYaRon!
| rowspan="3"|March 24, 2017
| rowspan="3"|—
| rowspan="3"|Bonus singles for buying all of the anime's first season Blu-ray volumes from Gamers, Softmap, and Animate, respectively
|-
| "Lonely Tuning"
| Azalea
|-
| "Guilty Eyes Fever"
| Guilty Kiss
|-
| "Happy Party Train"
| Aqours
| April 5, 2017
| 2
| Aqours' third single
|-
| 
| CYaRon!
| May 10, 2017
| 6
| CYaRon!'s second single
|-
| "Galaxy Hide and Seek"
| Azalea
| May 31, 2017
| 4
| Azalea's second single
|-
| 
| Guilty Kiss
| June 21, 2017
| 4
| Guilty Kiss' second single
|-
|"Landing Action Yeah!!"
|Aqours
|June 30, 2017
|3
|Aqours' ''Next Step! Projects theme song (purchasable as a membership to the Aqours Club)
|-
| 
| rowspan="3"|Aqours
| October 25, 2017
| 3
| JP: Gold
| Opening theme of the anime's second season
|-
| 
| November 15, 2017
| 4
| rowspan="2"| 
| Ending theme of the anime's second season
|-
|  / Miracle Wave"
| November 29, 2017
| 2
| rowspan="3"|Insert songs of the anime's second season
|-
| "Awaken the Power"
| Saint Aqours Snow (Aqours & Saint Snow)
| December 20, 2017
| 3
| JP: Gold
|-
| "Water Blue New World" / "Wonderful Stories"
| Aqours
| January 18, 2018
| 4
| rowspan="19"|
|-
| 
| CYaRon!
| rowspan="3"|June 22, 2018
| rowspan="3"|—
| rowspan="3"|Bonus singles for buying all of the anime's second season Blu-ray volumes from Gamers, Softmap, and Animate, respectively
|-
| 
| Azalea
|-
| "Guilty!? Farewell Party"
| Guilty Kiss
|-
| 
| rowspan="2"|Aqours
| June 30, 2018
| 4
| Theme song for the Aqours Hop! Step! Jump! which also contains subunit mixes for each group. Available on a special Aqours Club CD set.
|-
| "Thank you, Friends!!" / "No.10"
| August 1, 2018
| 3
| Theme song of Aqours 4th LoveLive! Sailing to the Sunshine concert
|-
| 
| Yoshiko Tsushima (Aika Kobayashi), Hanamaru Kunikida (Kanako Takatsuki), and Ruby Kurosawa (Ai Furihata)
| rowspan="3"|November 24, 2018
| rowspan="3"|—
| rowspan="3"|Bonus singles from 7-Eleven
|-
| "Marine Border Parasol"
| Chika Takami (Anju Inami), Riko Sakurauchi (Rikako Aida), and You Watanabe (Shuka Saito)
|-
| 
| Kanan Matsuura (Nanaka Suwa), Dia Kurosawa (Arisa Komiya), and Mari Ohara (Aina Suzuki)
|-
|  / "Next Sparkling!!"
| Aqours
| January 23, 2019
| 1
| rowspan="3"|Songs from Love Live! Sunshine!! The School Idol Movie: Over the Rainbow
|-
|  / "Hop? Stop? Nonstop!"
| Kanan Matsuura (Nanaka Suwa), Dia Kurosawa (Arisa Komiya), and Mari Ohara (Aina Suzuki) / Aqours
| January 30, 2019
| 2
|-
| "Believe Again" / "Brightest Melody" / "Over the Next Rainbow"
| Saint Snow / Aqours / Saint Aqours Snow
| February 6, 2019
| 3
|-
| "Jump Up High!!"
| rowspan="3"|Aqours
| June 30, 2019
| 2
| Theme song for the Aqours' Jump Up! project, which also contains subunit mixes for each group. Available on a special Aqours Club CD set.
|-
| 
| September 25, 2019
| 3
| Aqours' fourth single
|-
| "Kokoro Magic 'A to Z'"
| October 30, 2019
| 4
| rowspan="4"|Special singles for Love Live! School Idol Festival All Stars
|-
| "New Romantic Sailors"
| Guilty Kiss
| November 27, 2019
| 2
|-
| "Braveheart Coaster"
| CYaRon!
| December 4, 2019
| 3
|-
| "Amazing Travel DNA"
| Azalea
| December 11, 2019
| 3
|-
| 
| Aqours(as "CYaZalea Kiss")
| May 8, 2020
|—
| Special CD single for Unit Live Adventure 2020: Perfect World.
The song was first featured as part of an official April Fools' Day video on April 1, 2020.
|-
| "Fantastic Departure!"
| Aqours
| July 22, 2020
| 3
| JP: Gold
| Theme song for the group's sixth live
|-
| "Dazzling White Town"
| Saint Snow
| August 19, 2020
| 5
| rowspan="5" |
| Saint Snow's first single
|-
|"Jimo-Ai Dash!"
|Aqours
|August 26, 2020
|5
|Theme song for the group's 5th anniversary, which also contains solo mixes for each member. Available on a special Aqours Club CD set.
|-
|"Smile Smile Ship Start!"
|Aqours
|March 31, 2021
|4
|Aqours' fifth anniversary single with 3D animated music video
|-
|"Dreamy Color"
|Aqours
|June 30, 2021
|4
|Aqours' We Are Challengers Project theme song, featuring a live-action music video, and available on Aqours Club CD Set 2021 Hologram Edition
|-
|"Ku-Ru-Ku-Ru Cruller!"
|Aqours
|September 22, 2021
|6
|Collaboration single with Mixi for Monster Strike video game. Includes a music video.
|-
| colspan="6" align="center" style="font-size: 8pt" | "—" denotes releases that were ineligible to chart.
|}

Original song CDs

 Extended plays (EPs) 

Albums

Live concerts and video albums

Love Live! Nijigasaki High School Idol Club

While working individually, the girls also released singles as group as well as divided into three mini units. The members of each unit were decided by votes from fans. Instead of three mini units consisting of three members each as previously seen with μ's and Aqours, the Nijigasaki girls were divided into groups of two, three, and four. Voting on the three first mini units along with their names concluded on June 10, 2019. The fourth subunit was announced on July 1, 2021, with their name decided on September 1.

As of September 1, 2021, there are currently four subunits: DiverDiva (Karin and Ai), A・Zu・Na (Ayumu, Shizuku, and Setsuna'''), Qu4rtz (pronounced "Quartz", Kasumi, Kanata, Emma, and Rina), and R3birth (pronounced "Rebirth", Shioriko, Mia, and Lanzhu).

Singles

Original song CDs

Albums

Live concerts and video albums

Love Live! Superstar!!

Singles

Original song CDs

Albums

Love Live! franchise

Live concerts

Albums

Notes

References

External links 
  
  
  
  

Anime soundtracks
Lantis (company)
Love Live!
Film and television discographies
Video game music discographies